Play Ball may refer to:

Film and television
 Playball (film), a 2008 film directed by Alfonso Rodríguez
 Play Ball (serial), 1925 film by Spencer Gordon Bennet believed to be lost
 "Play Ball!", an episode in the fourth season of the children's television show Barney & Friends
 Play Ball (film), a 1937 short film

Literature and publishing
 Play Ball (manga), Akio Chiba's 1970s manga, later adapted to anime form
 Play Ball: Stories of the Ball Field, King Kelly's 1888 autobiography

Theatre
 Play Ball, an alternative name for play Chicago

Music
 "Play Ball" (song), a 2014 song by AC/DC
 "Play Ball" (プレイ・ボール), a 2002 song by Hikaru Utada from the album Deep River

See also
Ball Play (disambiguation)